Jack Raymond Hindle (born 29 October 1993) is an English professional footballer who plays as a striker for Warrington Rylands.

Career
Born in Warrington, Hindle signed for Barrow in 2018, having previously played for Radcliffe Borough, 1874 Northwich and Colwyn Bay. He was Barrow's top scorer in the 2018–19 season, but struggled for form at the start of the 2019–20 season due to personal issues. He moved on loan to Gateshead in February 2020, and to Northern Premier League side South Shields on loan until the end of the year, for whom he made 6 appearances in all competitions. He was released by Barrow on 3 January 2021 after his contract expired. On 14 February 2021 he signed for Malaysian club Kelantan, scoring 3 goals in 10 league games for the club. On 28 January 2022, Hindle signed for Northern Premier League Premier Division side Matlock Town. On 3 March 2022, Hindle signed for former side Radcliffe. In August 2022, Hindle signed for Flint Town United in the Cymru Premier. He returned to England to join Warrington Rylands in March 2023.

References

1993 births
Living people
English footballers
Association football forwards
Radcliffe F.C. players
1874 Northwich F.C. players
Colwyn Bay F.C. players
Barrow A.F.C. players
Gateshead F.C. players
South Shields F.C. (1974) players
Kelantan F.C. players
Matlock Town F.C. players
Flint Town United F.C. players
Warrington Rylands 1906 F.C. players
Malaysia Premier League players
National League (English football) players
English Football League players
Northern Premier League players
Cymru Premier players
English expatriate footballers
English expatriates in Malaysia
Expatriate footballers in Malaysia